A murder of crows is the collective noun for a group of crows. In popular culture, it may refer to:

Theater, film, television
 A Murder of Crows (film), 1999 film
 A Murder of Crows, a play written in 1992 by Mac Wellman 
A Murder of Crows, a 2010 episode of season 29 of the American television series Nature about the current study of crows
"A Murder of Crowes", the second episode of season 5 of the FX series Justified

Music
Bands
 The Murder of Crows, a band comprising Gaelynn Lea and Alan Sparhawk
 A Murder of Crows, a Scottish grunge band comprising Kenny Robertson and Raymond Shaw

Albums
 A Murder of Crows (album), 2003 studio album by Deadsoul Tribe
 One Crow Murder, CD by Ben Prestage
 A Crow Left of the Murder... (album), 2004 studio album by Incubus

Songs
 "Come Join the Murder", a song by The White Buffalo with The Forest Rangers
 "Murder of Birds", opening track on Jesca Hoop's 2014 album Undress
 "A Murder of One", a song on Counting Crows' 1993 album August and Everything After

Games
A Murder of Crows, a spell (for the hunter class) in the game "World of Warcraft"
Sword of the Stars: A Murder of Crows, a 2006 expansion to the video game Sword of the Stars
Murder of Crows, a Vigor (genetic alteration) in BioShock Infinite
Murder of Crows, a level in Hitman: Blood Money
A Murder of Crows, a secondary quest in Dragon Age II
Murder of Crows, a necromancer ability in Darksiders 2
Murder of Crows, a 2012 board game by Atlas Games
A Murder of Crows, the first scenario in the campaign of Heroes of Might and Magic V: Tribes of the East

Other
A Murder of Crows, the second novel in The Junction Chronicles series by David Rotenberg
Murder of Crows, the second book in the Others series by Anne Bishop
Murder of Crows, Issue #48 of Swamp Thing, written by Alan Moore